Lincs FM is an Independent Local Radio radio station serving Lincolnshire and Newark in Nottinghamshire. The station is owned and operated by Bauer as part of the Hits Radio Network.

As of December 2022, the station has a weekly audience of 239,000 listeners according to RAJAR.

Background
Lincs FM commenced broadcasting from studios at Witham Park in Lincoln on 1 March 1992. It was part of the wider Lincs FM Group of eight radio stations.

In March 2019, it was announced that the radio station and its sister stations had been bought by Bauer Media for an undisclosed sum.

Programming
Most output is produced locally at the station's Lincoln studios.

From February 2021, the station began to relay Bauer's networked Sunday afternoon programme The UK Chart Show, replacing the local chart previously broadcast in the slot.

Transmitters

The main transmitter 102.2 FM signal comes from the Belmont transmitting station. It also has lower-powered frequencies in Grantham, south of the town near the bypass, on 96.7 FM and Trent View Flats (near the John Leggott College) in Scunthorpe on 97.6 FM. Lincs FM can be clearly heard in northern Nottinghamshire and eastern South Yorkshire. The Belmont transmitter relays Digital One and in 2015 a local Lincolnshire multiplex was launched from the site. This operates on the old MXR frequency 12B. The Lincs FM Group broadcasting engineer is Andy Langford.

On 3 April 2023, Bauer will replace Lincs FM on FM with Greatest Hits Radio Lincolnshire on 102.2FM, 96.7FM and 97.6FM. However, Lincs FM will continue to air on DAB.

References

External links
 
 Lincs FM Group
  History of local radio stations in Lincolnshire
 OFCOM licence
 Review of the station at Ciao!
 DooYoo
 Belmont transmitting station
 Grantham transmitting station
 Trent View Flats transmitting station

Audio clips
 Jingle package
 Recording the jingles for Lincs FM Group stations at S2 Blue in Leek
 There's more to Cleethorpes than meets the eye in 2003
 How not to record jingles
 1992 jingles
 1995 jingles
 1999 jingles
 S2Blue 2006 package
 YouTube

Video clips
 Lincs FM 102 YouTube channel
 Former presenter Duncan Newmarch now as a BBC1 continuity announcer in December 2009

Radio stations established in 1992
Radio stations in Lincolnshire
Lincoln, England
Bauer Radio